Christopher "Chris" Czerapowicz (born 15 September 1991) is a Swedish-American professional basketball player for MoraBanc Andorra of the LEB Oro. He is also a member of the Sweden national team, making his senior debut in 2016.

College career

College statistics

|-
| 2010–11
| Davidson Wildcats
| 21
| 0
| 9.3
| .375
| .291
| .600
| 1.9
| 0.3
| 0.2
| 0.1
| 3.5
|-
| 2011–12
| Davidson Wildcats
| 33
| 7
| 25.1
| .414
| .342
| .694
| 4.9
| 0.7
| 0.2
| 0.4
| 10.1
|-
| 2012–13
| Davidson Wildcats
| 34
| 34
| 25.7
| .431
| .390
| .792
| 5.0
| 0.5
| 0.4
| 0.2
| 9.1
|-
| 2013–14
| Davidson Wildcats
| 33
| 33
| 25.3
| .415
| .288
| .705
| 4.3
| 0.7
| 0.5
| 0.3
| 8.8
|}

Professional career

Södertälje Kings (2014–2016) 
Czerapowicz began his career playing with the first-tiered Swedish team Södertälje Kings in the 2014-15 season, helping the team win the league both 2015 and 2016.

Miasto Szkła Krosno (2016–2017) 
In June 2016, Czerapowicz joined first-tiered Polish team Miasto Szkła Krosno.

MoraBanc Andorra (2017) 
In February 2017, it was announced that Czerapowicz was leaving Krosno to join BC MoraBanc Andorra playing in Spanish Liga ACB.

Tsmoki-Minsk (2017–2018) 
In August 2017, it was announced that Czerapowicz would be joining Belarusian Tsmoki-Minsk in the Russian first-tier league VTB United League.

Nizhny Novgorod (2018–2019) 
After a great first season in the VTB United League, BC Nizhny Novgorod announced in July that they had signed a two-year deal with Czerapowicz.

Monbus Obradoiro (2019–2021) 
On July 19, 2019, Czerapowicz signed with Spanish club Monbus Obradoiro.

UCAM Murcia (2021–2022) 
On July 5, 2021, Czerapowicz signed with UCAM Murcia.

BC Andorra (2022–present) 
On August 5, 2022, he has signed with MoraBanc Andorra of the LEB Oro.

International career 
Czerapowicz began his career with the national team 2007, playing in the U16 (2007) team. He has also represented Sweden in the U18 (2008, 2009), U20 (2010, 2011) and UNI (2013) teams. He was invited to play with the senior team for EuroBasket 2013 but declined due to unfinished studies at Davidson. His senior debut came at the EuroBasket 2017 qualification 2016.

References

External links 
 RealGM.com profile
 FIBA.com profile

1991 births
Living people
BC Andorra players
American expatriate basketball people in Andorra
BC Nizhny Novgorod players
BC Tsmoki-Minsk players
CB Murcia players
Davidson Wildcats men's basketball players
KKK MOSiR Krosno players
Liga ACB players
Obradoiro CAB players
Shooting guards
Small forwards
Södertälje Kings players
Sportspeople from Gothenburg
Swedish expatriate basketball people in Belarus
Swedish expatriate basketball people in Poland
Swedish expatriate basketball people in Russia
Swedish expatriate basketball people in Spain
Swedish men's basketball players
Swedish people of American descent
Swedish people of Polish descent